ColineOpéra is a French endowment fund that, with the collaboration of the world's greatest voices, produces operas and lyrical recitals for associations working in the field of health, protection and education of children at risk; , the MVE Foundation and the Association Toutes à l'École.

References

External links 
 Official website

Financial endowments
Foundations based in France
French record producers